Finella adamsi is a species of sea snail, a marine gastropod mollusc in the family Obtortionidae.

Distribution

Description 
The maximum recorded shell length is 4.6 mm.

The structure is similar to a cone. With typically five grooves.

Habitat 

They are recorded to be living at the depth ranging from 0 to 30m

References

Obtortionidae
Gastropods described in 1889